École may refer to:

 an elementary school in the French educational stages normally followed by secondary education establishments (collège and lycée)
 École (river), a tributary of the Seine flowing in région Île-de-France
 École, Savoie, a French commune
 École-Valentin, a French commune in the Doubs département
 Grandes écoles, higher education establishments in France
 The École, a French-American bilingual school in New York City

Ecole may refer to:
 Ecole Software, a Japanese video-games developer/publisher